McCormac is a surname. Notable people with the surname include:

Gerry McCormac (born 1958), Northern Irish physicist and academic administrator
John McCormac (born 1958), American politician

See also
McCormack